Atchison, Topeka and Santa Fe Railway 3759 is a class 3751 standard gauge 4-8-4 "Heavy Mountain" type steam railway locomotive built by the Baldwin Locomotive Works in 1928. It is on display in Locomotive Park, located between Andy Devine Avenue and Beale Street in Kingman, Arizona. The park was established in August 1957 with AT&SF 3759 donated to the City of Kingman in recognition of Kingman's history with the railroad.  The locomotive is termed a Mountain type on the nearby information plaque, and also in the City's descriptive material  which is correct for the Santa Fe. ATSF 4-8-4s were referenced in documentation as type "Heavy Mountain", "New Mountain" or "Mountain 4-wheel trailer."  

3759 was delivered in 1928 as a 3751 class "Heavy Mountain" 4-8-4 passenger locomotive.  Originally a coal-burning locomotive with 73-inch drivers, the fleet was converted to oil in 1936 and rebuilt between 1938 and 1941 with 80-inch drivers. Its regular service was pulling passenger trains on the Santa Fe's main line through Kingman, which was a water stop. Retired in 1953, the engine had traveled over 2,585,000 miles.

In February 1955, 3759 was brought out of retirement at the request of the Railway Club of Southern California for a special excursion run, dubbed "Farewell to Steam."  This special ran on February 6, a round trip between Los Angeles Union Station and Barstow, California with stops in Pasadena and San Bernardino and was the last Santa Fe revenue steam train to leave Los Angeles and to traverse Cajon Pass.  After this trip, 3759 went back into storage, until Santa Fe donated the locomotive to the city of Kingman in 1957.

The locomotive was added to the National Register of Historic Places as AT & SF Locomotive in 1986, with reference number 86001113. It was evaluated for National Register listing as part of a 1985 study of 63 historic resources in Kingman that led to this and many others being listed.

In 1987 caboose 999520 was retired and donated to Kingman to be added behind 3759. The residents of Kingman pulled the locomotive forward  to make room for the caboose.

In January 1991, Grand Canyon Railway owner Max Biegert sent a letter to Kingman city officials of his proposal to lease AT&SF 3759 to operation and donate his engine No. 19 to the city. 3759 would have run on the Grand Canyon Railway and an "Orient Express"-styled train between Los Angeles and Williams, Arizona. The community reacted negatively to the plan and it did not go forward.

References

External links
 

Railway vehicles on the National Register of Historic Places in Arizona
Railway locomotives on the National Register of Historic Places
4-8-4 locomotives
3759
Baldwin locomotives
Buildings and structures in Mohave County, Arizona
Individual locomotives of the United States
Railway locomotives introduced in 1928
Tourist attractions in Mohave County, Arizona
Kingman, Arizona
Standard gauge locomotives of the United States
National Register of Historic Places in Kingman, Arizona
Preserved steam locomotives of Arizona